GUFC may refer to the following association football clubs:

 Galway United F.C.
 Garankuwa United F.C.
 Garswood United F.C.
 Gibraltar United F.C.
 Glacis United F.C.
 Glasgow University F.C.
 Gloucester United F.C.
 Gombak United FC
 Gravesend United F.C.
 Greystones United F.C.

See also
GUAFC (disambiguation)